Rabbi Gavriel ("Reb Velvele") Zev Margolis (1847 in Vilna – 1935 in New York City) was an Orthodox Rabbi in the United States known for being an uncompromising traditionalist.

Biography
Margolis was ordained by Rabbi Jacob Barit and Rabbi Naphtali Judah Berlin. He taught and preached in Grodno (where his father-in-law Rabbi Nachum Grodno lived), before being invited to Vilna to assist Rabbi Eizele Charif publish his commentary on the Jerusalem Talmud. He later served as the head of the rabbinical courts in Mogilev Province, and Jasionowka.

In 1907, Margolis immigrated to the United States, settling in Boston, where he served as chief rabbi of seven local congregations.

In 1911, due to a dispute about kashrus he moved to New York. Margolis was involved in a fair number of disputes in his lifetime due to his uncompromising religious views. He was against Zionism , the Yeshiva College, and the Aguddas Harabbonim,

The definitive account of Margolis's life is Joshua Hoffman's thesis entitled: "The American Rabbinic Career of Rabbi Gavriel Zev Margolis"."

References

Citations

Sources
Goldman, Yosef. Hebrew Printing in America, 1735-1926, A History and Annotated Bibliography (YGBooks 2006). .
The American Rabbinic Career of Rabbi Gavriel Zev Margolis

1847 births
1935 deaths
American Haredi rabbis